Kamenná is a municipality and village in Jihlava District in the Vysočina Region of the Czech Republic. It has about 200 inhabitants.

History
The first written mention of Kamenná is from 1308.

References

Villages in Jihlava District